Árpád Farkas (born 28 October 1957) is a Hungarian gymnast. He competed in eight events at the 1976 Summer Olympics.

References

1957 births
Living people
Hungarian male artistic gymnasts
Olympic gymnasts of Hungary
Gymnasts at the 1976 Summer Olympics
Gymnasts from Budapest